George Edward Briggs FRS (25 June 1893 – 7 February 1985) was Professor of Botany at the University of Cambridge.

He was born in Grimsby, Lincolnshire, the eldest son of Walker Thomas and Susan (née Townend) Briggs.

He was elected a Fellow of the Royal Society in 1935. He published several significant scientific papers on enzymes. Part of his work on enzymes was done with J. B. S. Haldane, and led to the derivation of Victor Henri's enzyme kinetics law and Michaelis–Menten kinetics via the steady state approximation. This derivation remains commonly used today because it provides better insight into the system, though it retains the algebraic form of the Michaelis-Menten equations.
Notable publications of Briggs include Movement of Water in Plants.

References

External links 
 Portrait of George Edward Briggs at the National Portrait Gallery in London, painted by Walter Stoneman

1893 births
1985 deaths
People from Grimsby
Fellows of the Royal Society
Professors of Botany (Cambridge)